Murdo McDougall was a Scottish football manager and former player. He was joint manager of the Icelandic national team in 1946.

References

Scottish football managers
Scottish footballers
Expatriate football managers in Iceland
Iceland national football team managers
Scottish expatriate football managers
Association footballers not categorized by position
Valur (men's football) managers
Year of birth missing
Scottish expatriates in Iceland